The 1977 Limerick Senior Hurling Championship was the 83rd staging of the Limerick Senior Hurling Championship since its establishment by the Limerick County Board.

South Liberties were the defending champions.

On 13 November 1977, Patrickswell won the championship after a 3-07 to 0-07 defeat of Killeedy in the final. It was their fifth championship title overall and their first title in seven championship seasons.

Results

Final

References

Limerick Senior Hurling Championship
Limerick Senior Hurling Championship